Tamerlan Ruslanovich Tmenov (born July 27, 1977) is a Russian judoka. He is a 2004 Olympic silver medalist, 2000 Olympic bronze medalist, and eight-time European Champion from 1998 to 2008. Tmenov is the vice president of the Russian Judo Federation.

Achievements

References

External links
 
 
 Videos of Tamerlan Tmenov on judovision.org

1977 births
Living people
Russian male judoka
Judoka at the 2000 Summer Olympics
Judoka at the 2004 Summer Olympics
Judoka at the 2008 Summer Olympics
Olympic judoka of Russia
Olympic silver medalists for Russia
Olympic bronze medalists for Russia
Sportspeople from Vladikavkaz
Olympic medalists in judo
Medalists at the 2004 Summer Olympics
Medalists at the 2000 Summer Olympics